Greta Wrage von Pustau (2 August 1902 – 20 March 1989) was a Chinese-born German dancer and dance teacher.

Biography 
Von Pustau was born on 2 August 1902 in Guangzhou. Her parents, Antonia and Alfred Julius Engelbrecht von Pustau, were merchants from Hamburg.

In 1921 she married Klaus Wrage, a landscape painter. They had three children.

Von Pustau studied dance under Rudolf von Laban in the 1920s. In 1932 she graduated from Folkwang University of the Arts and, in 1933, opened her own Laban dance school in Nuremberg. She performed Laban's original choreography in the 1936 Summer Olympics opening ceremony. In 1953 sculptor Luis Rauschhuber created a bust of her.

Her work is archived at the Deutsches Tanzarchiv Köln.

References 

1902 births
1989 deaths
Dance teachers
Expressionist dancers
German female dancers
Laban movement analysis
People from Guangzhou
Folkwang University of the Arts alumni
German expatriates in China